Buzludzha is a historical peak in the Central Balkan Mountains, Bulgaria. The mountain is located to the east of the Shipka Pass near the town of Kazanlak and is a site of historical importance. It was renamed to Hadzhi Dimitar (Хаджи Димитър) in 1942 but remains popularly known as Buzludzha. The summit is limestone and granite. Its slopes are covered with grassy vegetation; its foothills and the neighbouring peaks sustain beech forests. The peak's name derives from  'icy'.

History 
In 1868 it was the place of the final battle between Bulgarian rebels led by Hadzhi Dimitar and Stefan Karadzha and forces of the Ottoman Empire. On 31 July, Hadzhi Dimitar and a band of 30 chetniks fought a losing battle against 700 Ottoman troops; only four Bulgarians survived. Their action served as an inspiration for the Liberation of Bulgaria from the Ottomans ten years later; the decisive battle of that conflict was fought a few miles away at the Shipka Pass. The battle of Buzludzha inspired the renown Bulgarian poet and revolutionary Hristo Botev to write the poem "Hadzhi Dimitar":

In 1891 the mountain was the site chosen for the first congress of the Bulgarian Social Democratic Workers Party (later the Bulgarian Communist Party) led by Dimitar Blagoev. In 1944 the peak was the scene of fighting between Communist partisans and detachments of the Bulgarian Army when the latter were attacked whilst operating there. 

Following  a desire for a national monument at the peak to commemorate these events (proposed as early as 1898) the Buzludzha Monument was built between 1971 and 1981, by public subscription. The site has several other monuments to its history: A statue of Hadzhi Dimitar, a relief of the 1891 Congress, and a monument to the partisans who fought there in 1944. In 1974, TNT blasting was employed to remove more than 15,000 cubic metres of rock and create a level foundation for building the new memorial house.

Travel 
Buzludzha can be reached by two side roads from the Shipka Pass: either a  road from Kazanlak in the south or a  road from Gabrovo on the north side of the mountain.

In popular culture 

In December 2020 British pop-singer Rita Ora shot her new music video ‘Big’ Ora on Buzludzha Peak with permission from the local government.

See also 
 Bulgarka Nature Park

Citations

References

Bibliography 
Adrien Minard, Bouzloudja. Crépuscule d'une utopie, Paris, Éditions B2, 2018.

External links 
Buzludzha 3D
Mountains of Bulgaria
Balkan mountains
Landforms of Stara Zagora Province
Place names of Turkish origin in Bulgaria